Jammu Tawi (station code: JAT) is a railway station in Jammu city in the Indian union territory of Jammu and Kashmir.

Background
Jammu Tawi is the largest railway station in Jammu and Kashmir. It is a major railhead for other places in the region and for tourists heading towards the Kashmir Valley. The Jammu–Baramulla line begins here. Administratively, it is in the Firozpur division of Northern Railways.

Jammu Tawi is well connected to major Indian cities by trains. The station code is JAT. The third longest running train in India, in terms of time and distance, the Himsagar Express that goes to Kanyakumari, Tamil Nadu in 70 hours, use to originate from here. Now it originates from Shri Mata Vaishno Devi Katra railway station. Most premium express train of India, Vande Bharat Express, makes a stop here.

History
The station also linked with Wazirabad and Narowal stations, both of which are in Pakistan today. The old Jammu station was built in around 1897 but was abandoned after the Partition of India as the railway link to Sialkot was broken. Jammu had no rail services until 1971, when the Indian Railways laid the Pathankot–Jammu Tawi broad-gauge line. The new Jammu Tawi station was opened in 1975. In 2000, much of the old railway station was demolished to make way for an art centre. Previously the station used to be managed by the post of DTM which is now also named as Station Director. The present Station Director (SD) is Sh. Uchit Singhal (an IRTS officer of 2014 batch). The Jammu station is also planned to be remodelled and redesigned under Station re-development plan expected to complete by 2024.

Electrification
The entire Jalandhar–Jammu section, Jammu Tawi station and sidings have been completely energized to 25 kV AC and approved for electric traction in August 2014. Swaraj Express now gets an end to end WAP-4 from Jammu Tawi to Bandra Terminus. Himgiri Express now gets an end to end WAP-7 from Jammu Tawi to Howrah.

See also

 Jammu–Baramulla line
 Northern Railways
 Srinagar railway station
 List of railway stations in Jammu and Kashmir

Gallery

References

External links
 Ministry of Indian Railways, Official website
 Jammu Tawi Train Time Table

Railway stations in Jammu district
Buildings and structures in Jammu (city)
Railway stations opened in 1975
Firozpur railway division
1975 establishments in Jammu and Kashmir
Transport in Jammu
19th-century establishments in Jammu and Kashmir